In the Forest is a 1944 picture book by Marie Hall Ets. A boy walks through the forest and is joined by animals who follow behind him. The book was a recipient of a 1945 Caldecott Honor for its illustrations.

References

1944 children's books
American children's books
American picture books
Children's fiction books
Fantasy books
Caldecott Honor-winning works
English-language books
Fictional children
Books about elephants
Fictional kangaroos and wallabies
Books about lions
Fictional monkeys
Books about rabbits and hares
Forests in fiction
Viking Press books